The HSY-55-class gunboat is a class of naval vessel designed by the Hellenic Navy and built by Hellenic Shipyards (HSY). This class of ship uses the modular concept so that weapons and sensors can be changed as required. The first pair was ordered on 20 February 1990, but completion was delayed by the shipyard's financial problems. Pyrpolitis (P57) was launched on 16 September 1992, and Polemistis (P61) on 21 June 1993. Each ship can carry 25 fully equipped troops. Alternative guns and Harpoon SSM can be fitted as required.

Pyrpolitis was renamed Kasos on 11 November 2005, after the island of Kasos in the Dodecanese. The ship is based in the area of Kasos, and the name recognises the island and the Kasos Massacre during the Greek War of Independence.

Ships

See also
 Current Hellenic Navy ships

References

Patrol boat classes
Naval ships of Greece
Patrol vessels of the Hellenic Navy
Ships built in Greece